2 Lupi is a single star in the southern constellation of Lupus, located 326 light-years away from the Sun. It has the Bayer designation f Lupi; 2 Lupi is the Flamsteed designation. This object is visible to the naked eye as a faint, orange-hued star with an apparent visual magnitude of 4.33. It is moving closer to the Earth with a heliocentric radial velocity of −3 km/s.

The suffix notation indicates abnormally weak lines of carbyne. Having exhausted the hydrogen at its core, the star evolved away from the main sequence by expanding to 11 times the Sun's radius. It is a suspected variable star of unknown type.

References

K-type giants
Lupus (constellation)
Lupi, f
Durchmusterung objects
Lupi, 2
135758
074857
5686